Passata is a sans-serif font designed specially for Aarhus University as part of a new visual identity implemented in late 2008. It is a modernised version of Futura, which it replaced as their corporate branding font.

References

Geometric sans-serif typefaces